Ilyas Abbadi (born 21 October 1992) is an Algerian professional boxer. As an amateur, he competed in the men's welterweight event at the 2012 Summer Olympics, but was defeated in the first round by British fighter Fred Evans. At the 2016 Summer Olympics in Rio de Janeiro, he competed in the men's middleweight division. He was defeated in the second round by Zhanibek Alimkhanuly of Kazakhstan.

Abbadi also won silver medals at the 2011 African Championships and the 2011 Arab Championships.

References

External links
 

Living people
1992 births
Algerian male boxers
Welterweight boxers
Southpaw boxers
Olympic boxers of Algeria
Boxers at the 2012 Summer Olympics
Boxers at the 2016 Summer Olympics
Mediterranean Games gold medalists for Algeria
Mediterranean Games medalists in boxing
Competitors at the 2013 Mediterranean Games
Competitors at the 2015 African Games
People from Médéa